Take a Pair of Private Eyes is a  British comedy crime television series which originally aired on BBC 2 in six episodes from 10 April to 15 May 1966. It was written by Peter O'Donnell, best known as the creator of Modesty Blaise. The title is a reference to the Gilbert and Sullivan song Take a Pair of Sparking Eyes. In the style of The Thin Man it focuses on Ambrose and Dominique Fraynes a husband and wife who run a private detective agency assisted by his father Hector.

Cast

 Derek Fowlds as Ambrose Frayne
 Jeanne Roland as  Dominique Frayne
 Sam Kydd as Hector Frayne
 Henry McGee as Charles
 Bridget Armstrong as Cornelia
 John Bryans as Feinster 
 John Sharp as Crozier
 Peter Forbes-Robertson as Roger Curran
 Ivor Salter as M. Brienne
 Campbell Singer as Insp. Roth
 George Lee as Police constable
 Victor Maddern as  Cokey Brock
 Jeanne Moody as	 Marian
 Margaret Nolan as  Doreen
 John Cater as Lyall Sankey
 Yvonne Ball as 	 Barmaid
 Alexandra Dane as 	 Girl
 Roy Denton as Sam
 Peter Diamond as  Thug
 James Fairley as  Butler 
 Clare Jenkins as  Girl in pub
 Edward Jewesbury as  Insp. Marshall
 Tom McCall as Musician
 Brian Moorehead as 	 Police sergeant
 Derek Price as Musician
 John Quarmby as Detective sergeant
 John Rapley as Hearse driver
 Harry Tardios as Manzella
 Francesca Tu as Japanese girl
 Del Watson as Thug
 Gabrielle Wheeler as  Maid

References

Bibliography
Baskin, Ellen . Serials on British Television, 1950-1994. Scolar Press, 1996.
 Reilly, John M. Twentieth Century Crime & Mystery Writers. Springer, 2015.

External links
 

BBC television dramas
1966 British television series debuts
1966 British television series endings
1960s British drama television series
1960s British television miniseries
English-language television shows